Donald Morrogh was an Irish soccer player during the 1890s.

He played for the amateur Bohemians during these times alongside the likes of Robert Murray, Oliver St. John Gogarty and the Sheehan brothers, George and Willie. Donald won one full international caps for the Ireland team, in 1896.

Morrogh also played a part in Bohemians' 6 Leinster Senior Cup final victories in a row during the 1890s.

Honours
Leinster Senior Cup
 Bohemians 1894, 1895, 1896

References

Bohemian F.C. players
Pre-1950 IFA international footballers
Year of death missing
Year of birth missing
Irish association footballers (before 1923)
Association footballers not categorized by position